This is a list of banks in Kyrgyzstan.

Central bank
 National Bank of the Kyrgyz Republic

Commercial banks

Local banks

Foreign banks

Defunct banks

Kyrgyzstan
Banks
Banks

Kyrgyzstan